Michael "Bruce Lee" Domingo  (born August 23, 1979 in Lebak, Sultan Kudarat, Philippines) is a Filipino retired professional boxer and current WBO Oriental bantamweight champion.

Professional career
On September 14, 2008, Domingo took on Thai boxer Ratanachai Sor Vorapin, who gave former WBO champion Gerry Peñalosa a hard time before being stopped in the 8th round a few months before at the Araneta Coliseum. The fight was part of the “Daytime Boxing” fight card at the Cebu Coliseum. Domingo was trained by former boxer Edito “Ala” Villamor. The Filipino boxer scored a 9th-round technical knockout victory over Vorapin to retain the regional World Boxing Organization Oriental bantamweight title.

Domingo was scheduled to fight Luis Melendez of Colombia, known for his fight with Filipino boxer Z Gorres on May 1, 2010. The Domingo-Melendez bout was the main event of the card billed as “HANGAD NA PAGHIHIGANTI” (Dream Vendetta) and was supposed to be held on May 1, 2010, at the Waterfront Hotel in Lahug, Cebu City. However, the match was postponed to May 23.

Domingo was looking for a knockout win in this fight, to avenge Gorres' loss. After being knocked down by Melendez in the last round of his unanimous decision win, Gorres collapsed and was sent to the hospital for emergency neurosurgery. When asked upon the fight, Domingo said: “I am very happy to be given this opportunity to fight Melendez. I want to show the world that we Filipinos do not back away from a fight." He also added: “This fight is personal. This fight is a very emotional one for me. I cried when I learned what happened to Gorres. I want to show Gorres what I can do.”

Domingo came in at 119 pound during the official weigh-in. The Filipino boxer won the bout by KO in the 2nd round. After the win Domingo turned into his friend Z Gorres, who was seating at the ringside. In his next fight, he faced Vusi Malinga in an IBF Bantamweight Title eliminator bout in South Africa. Domingo lost the bout by majority decision.

In the PINOY PRIDE: Battle of Cebu, Michael Domingo make another knock out against Richard Samosir, of Semarang, Indonesia. Michael Domingo dominated the fight applying pressure and meaningful shot. After round six the referee called the RTD (retired) after Richard Samosir signaled in his corner. Making it a history of 41 wins and 19 knock outs. The event held at Hoops Dome, Lapu-Lapu City, Cebu, Philippines.

His last bout was on October 20, 2012.

He now works as a boxing coach.

References

External links

1979 births
Living people
Bantamweight boxers
Super-bantamweight boxers
Featherweight boxers
People from Sultan Kudarat
Filipino male boxers